Gus Lusk Hargett Jr. is an American retired military officer who served as Adjutant General of Tennessee.

References

External links
 MAJOR GENERAL GUS L. HARGETT, JR.

Living people
United States Army generals
Year of birth missing (living people)